Hemaruka is a locality in Alberta, Canada.

Hemaruka is a name coined from the first two letters of Helen, Margaret, Ruth and Kathleen, the daughters of a railroad official.

References 

Localities in Special Area No. 4